The Military Order of the Loyal Legion of the United States (MOLLUS), or simply the Loyal Legion is a United States patriotic order, organized April 15, 1865, by three veteran officers of the Army. The original membership was composed of members of the Army, Navy, or Marine Corps of the United States, who had served during the American Civil War as commissioned officers in Federal service, or who had served and thereafter been commissioned, and who thereby "had aided in maintaining the honor, integrity, and supremacy of the national movement" during the Civil War.

The Loyal Legion was formed by in response to rumors from Washington of a conspiracy to destroy the Federal government by assassination of its leaders, in the immediate aftermath of the assassination of President Abraham Lincoln. The founding members stated their purpose as the cherishing of the memories and associations of the war waged in defense of the unity and indivisibility of the Republic;  the strengthening of the ties of fraternal fellowship and sympathy formed by companionship in arms;  the relief of the widows and children of dead companions of the order; and the advancement of the general welfare of the soldiers and sailors of the United States. As the original officers died off, the veterans organization became an hereditary society. The modern organization is composed of men who are direct descendants, nephews or first cousins of these officers (hereditary members), and also other men who share the ideals of the Order (Associate members), who collectively are considered "Companions". A female auxiliary, Dames of the Loyal Legion of the United States (DOLLUS), was formed in 1899 and accepted as an affiliate in 1915.

Origins
Following the assassination of President Abraham Lincoln on April 14, 1865, rumors spread that the act had been part of a wider conspiracy to overthrow the legally constituted government of the United States by assassinating its chief men. Many people at first gave credence to these rumors, including three of the officers assigned to the honor guard for Lincoln's body as it was transported to Springfield, Illinois, for burial; these three men, Brevet Lt. Col. Samuel Brown Wylie Mitchell, Lt. Col. Thomas Ellwood Zell, and Captain Peter Dirck Keyser, are considered the founders of the Order. To demonstrate their loyalty, they decided to form a "Legion" modeled on the Revolutionary War Society of the Cincinnati. The Loyal Legion was organized largely during the same meetings that planned Lincoln's funeral (as well as during a mass meeting of Philadelphia war veterans on April 20), culminating in a meeting on May 31, 1865, in Independence Hall in Philadelphia, at which the name was chosen.

Originally, the Order was composed of three classes of members:
 Officers who had fought in the Army, Navy, or Marine Corps of the United States in the suppression of the Rebellion, or enlisted men who had so served and were subsequently commissioned in the regular forces of the United States, constituted the "Original Companions of the First Class." The eldest direct male lineal descendants of deceased Original Companions or deceased eligible officers could be admitted as "hereditary Companions of the First Class."
 "Companions of the Second Class" were the eldest direct male lineal descendants of living Original Companions or of living individuals who were eligible for membership in the First Class. (The use of the Rule of Primogeniture was abolished in 1905 for both the First and Second classes of membership, opening membership to all male lineal descendants, and later changes opened membership to male lineal descendants of siblings of eligible officers. As the former officers died off, and the Order became composed entirely of descendants, the Second Class of Companions was discontinued.)
 The Third Class comprised distinguished civilians who had rendered faithful and conspicuous service to the Union during the Civil War. By the law of the Order, no new elections to this class were made after 1890.

Later history
The Loyal Legion grew rapidly in the late 19th century and had Companions in every Northern state, and also in many of the states that had once formed the Confederacy.  The Commandery in Chief was established on October 21, 1885, with authority over the 14 state commanderies then in existence. Previously, the Pennsylvania Commandery functioned as the "first among equals" of the commanderies as it was both the oldest and largest.

At its height about 1900, the Order had more than 8,000 Civil War veterans as active members, including nearly all notable general and flag officers and several presidents: Ulysses S. Grant, William T. Sherman, Philip H. Sheridan, George H. Thomas, George B. McClellan, Rutherford B. Hayes, Chester A. Arthur, Benjamin Harrison, and William McKinley.  The Order's fame was great enough to inspire John Philip Sousa to compose the "Loyal Legion March" in its honor in 1890.

Today, the Order serves as a hereditary society (male descendants of eligible officers) rather than as a functioning military order (though many Companions are either military veterans or even on active military duty). Among other activities, Companions organize and participate in commemorative events, provide awards to deserving ROTC cadets, and assist with preservation efforts.  Of special note is that, each year, the Loyal Legion commemorates President Lincoln's birthday with a wreath-laying ceremony at the Lincoln Memorial in Washington, D.C.  In 2009, the MOLLUS helped coordinate an extended tribute with the help of the Abraham Lincoln Bicentennial Commission to celebrate the two-hundredth anniversary of Lincoln's birthday.

There are now three basic categories of membership:  Hereditary, Associate (non-hereditary), and Honorary.  Just as many Original Companions of the Order were also members of the Grand Army of the Republic (the "GAR"), many current Companions of the Order are also members of the Sons of Union Veterans of the Civil War, the legal heir to the GAR.

Organizationally, the Loyal Legion is composed of a National Commandery-in-Chief and individual state Commanderies.  There are currently 20 state Commanderies. Current national officers include Commander-in-Chief Col. Robert D. Pollock (Ret.) of Ohio, Senior Vice-Commander-in-Chief Michael Timothy Bates, Esq. of New Jersey, Junior Vice-Commander-in-Chief Paul Davis of Michigan, Treasurer-in-Chief Lee Alan Tryon, CPA of Connecticut, Recorder-in-Chief Gary L. Grove, PhD. of Pennsylvania, Registrar-in-Chief Jefferson D. Lilly II, MPA of Indiana, Judge Advocate-in-Chief Gerald F. Fisher, Esq. of New York, Surgeon-in-Chief Daniel H. Heller, M.D. of Arizona, and Chaplain-in-Chief Rev. Robert G. Carroon, PhD. of Connecticut. Recent past Commanders-in-Chief include Joseph T. Coleman, Ed.D. of Pennsylvania, Col. Eric A. Rojo (Ret.) of the District of Columbia, Capt. James Alan Simmons (Ret.) of Texas, Waldron Kintzing "Kinny" Post of New York, and Jeffry C. Burden, Esq. of Virginia.

The Loyal Legion is the third-oldest hereditary military society in the United States after the Society of the Cincinnati, instituted in 1783, and the Aztec Club of 1847.

Commanders-in-Chief
 Major General George Cadwalader – First MOLLUS Commander-in-Chief, 1865–79. (Died in office.)
 Major General Winfield Scott Hancock – 1879–86. (Died in office.)
 General Philip H. Sheridan – 1886–88. (Died in office.)
 Major General Rutherford B. Hayes – 1888–93. (Died in office.)
 Rear Admiral John J. Almy – 1893.
 Brigadier General Lucius Fairchild – 1893–95.
 Major General John Gibbon – 1895–96. (Died in office.)
 Rear Admiral Bancroft Gherardi – 1896–99.
 Lieutenant General John M. Schofield – 1899–1903.
 Major General David McMurtrie Gregg – 1903–05.
 Major General John R. Brooke – 1905–07.
 Major General Grenville M. Dodge – 1907–09.
 Lieutenant General John C. Bates – 1909–11.
 Rear Admiral George W. Melville – 1911–12. (Died in office.)
 Lieutenant General Arthur MacArthur – 1912. (Died in office.)
 Colonel Arnold A. Rand – 1912–13.  (First non-flag officer to serve as MOLLUS commander-in-chief.)
 Brevet Brigadier General Thomas Hamlin Hubbard – 1913–15. (Died in office.)
 Rear Admiral Louis Kempff – 1915.
 Lieutenant General Samuel B.M. Young – 1915–19.
 Lieutenant General Nelson A. Miles – 1919–25. (Died in office.)
 Rear Admiral Purnell F. Harrington – 1925–27.
 Master Robert M. Thompson, USN – 1927–30. (Died in office.)
 Brigadier General Samuel W. Fountain – 1930. (Died in office.)
 Brevet Major George Mason – 1930–31.
 Captain William P. Wright – 1931–33. (Died in office. Last Civil War veteran to serve as MOLLUS commander-in-chief. Also was Commander in Chief of the Grand Army of the Republic from 1932 to 1933.)
 Colonel Hugh Means – 1933–35.
 Colonel William Ennis Forbes – 1935–40. (Resigned.)
 Major General Malvern Hill Barnum – 1940–41.
 Mr. James Vernor, Jr. – 1941–47 (First MOLLUS commander-in-chief who did not serve in the United States Armed Forces.)
 Rear Admiral Reginald R. Belknap, USN – 1947–51.
 Donald H. Whittemore – 1951–53
 Commander William C. Duval, USNR – 1953–57
 Major General Ulysses S. Grant III – 1957–61. (Commander-in-chief of the Sons of Union Veterans of the Civil War, 1953–55.)
 Lieutenant Colonel Donald M. Liddell, Jr., USAR – 1961–62. (Resigned.)
 Lieutenant Colonel H. Durston Saylor II, USAR – 1962–64.
 Major General Clayton B. Volgel, USMC – 1964. (Died in office.  Last flag officer to serve as MOLLUS commander-in-chief.)
 Colonel Walter E. Hopper, USAR – 1964–67.
 Lieutenant Colonel Lenahan O'Connell, USAR – 1967–71.
 Colonel Brooke M. Lessig USAR – 1971–73.
 Charles Allan Brady, Jr. – 1973–75.
 Colonel Joseph B. Daugherty – 1975–77.
 Thomas N. McCarter III – 1977–81.
 Lieutenant Colonel Philip M. Watrous – 1981–83.
 Alexander P. Hartnett – 1983–85.
 William H. Upham – 1985–89. (Last commander-in-chief to serve more than two years in office.)
 1st Lieutenant Lowell V. Hammer – 1989–91. (Commander-in-chief of the Sons of Union Veterans of the Civil War, 1991–92.)
 Henry N. Sawyer – 1991–93.
 Colonel Scott W. Stucky, USAFR – 1993–95. (Federal judge.)
 The Rev. Canon Robert G. Carroon – 1995–97.
 Honorable Michael P. Sullivan – 1997–99.
 Major Robert J. Bateman – 1999–2001.
 Gordon R. Bury II – 2001–03. (Commander-in-chief of the Sons of Union Veterans of the Civil War, 1986–87.)
 Douglas R. Niermeyer, 2003–05.
 Benjamin C. Frick, Esq. 2005–07.
 Karl F. Schaeffer, 2007–09.
 Keith Harrison – 2009–11. (Commander-in-chief of the Sons of Union Veterans of the Civil War, 1994–95.)
 Jeffry C. Burden, Esq. – 2011–13.
 Waldron K. Post II – 2013–15.
 Captain James A. Simmons, USAF – 2015–17.
 Colonel Eric A. Rojo, USA – 2017–2019.
 Dr. Joseph T. Coleman – 2019–2021.
 Colonel Robert D. Pollock, USAF – 2021–   .

Prominent Companions

Note – the ranks indicated are the highest the individual held in the armed forces of the United States and not necessarily the highest rank held during the Civil War.

Presidents of the United States
 Abraham Lincoln (Captain, Illinois Militia) – Posthumously enrolled.
 Ulysses S. Grant (General, U.S. Army) – Veteran Companion.
 Rutherford B. Hayes (Brevet Major General, Volunteers) – Veteran Companion and MOLLUS Commander in Chief from 1888 to 1893.
 Chester A. Arthur (Brigadier General, New York Militia) – 3rd Class Companion.
 Benjamin Harrison (Brevet Brigadier General, Volunteers) – Veteran Companion.
 William McKinley (Brevet Major, 23rd Ohio Volunteer Infantry) – Veteran Companion.
 Herbert Hoover – Honorary Companion (elected in 1964).
 Dwight Eisenhower (General of the Army, U.S. Army) – Honorary Companion (elected in 1953).

Note – Presidents Andrew Johnson and James Garfield were both generals in the Union Army during the Civil War, and were thus eligible to be veteran companions of MOLLUS, but did not join the Order.

Vice Presidents
 Vice President Hannibal Hamlin, who had served under President Lincoln from 1861 to 1865, was elected as a MOLLUS Companion of the 3rd Class.  While he was vice president, he served as a corporal with Company A of the Maine State Guard (a.k.a. Maine Coast Guards) at Fort McClary in Kittery, Maine from July to September 1864.
 Vice President Henry Wilson, who served under President Grant from 1873 until his death in 1875, was colonel of the 22nd Regiment Massachusetts Volunteer Infantry and was a MOLLUS Companion of the First Class.
 Vice President Charles G. Dawes, who served under President Coolidge from 1925 to 1929, became a First Class Companion in succession to his father, Brevet Brigadier General Rufus Dawes.  Vice President Dawes served as a brigadier general with the U.S. Army during World War I and also received the Nobel Peace Prize.

In addition to the above, President Andrew Johnson, who was vice president prior to the death of President Lincoln and the founding of MOLLUS, was eligible to become a First Class Companion of MOLLUS but did not join the Order. President Chester A. Arthur, who was vice president prior to the death of President Garfield, was elected in 1882 as a 3rd Class Companion, while he was serving as president.

Honorary Companions
A limited number of individuals may be elected as Honorary Companions of MOLLUS.  They are usually individuals who have had distinguished careers either in public service or the military.
 President and General of the Army Dwight D. Eisenhower (elected in 1953)
 President Herbert Hoover (elected in 1964)
 Fleet Admiral Chester W. Nimitz – Commander in Chief of the Pacific Fleet and Chief of Naval Operations.
 General of the Army Omar Bradley – Chief of Staff of the United States Army and Chairman of the Joint Chiefs of Staff.
 Lieutenant General Milton G. Baker
 Lieutenant General John L. Ballantyne III
 Rear Admiral Thomas V. Cooper
 HRH Amadeo, Prince of Savoy
 Mr. Ken Burns – Filmmaker.
 Mr. Don Troiani – Artist.

Veteran Companions

United States Army
Note – The rank indicated is the highest held in the Regular Army, the Volunteers or in retirement.

Generals
 General Ulysses S. Grant – United States Army Commanding General.
 General William Tecumseh Sherman – United States Army Commanding General.
 General Philip H. Sheridan – United States Army Commanding General and MOLLUS Commander in Chief, 1886–88.
 Lieutenant General John M. Schofield – Medal of Honor recipient, United States Army Commanding General and MOLLUS Commander in Chief, 1899–1903.
 Lieutenant General Nelson A. Miles – Medal of Honor recipient, United States Army Commanding General and MOLLUS Commander in Chief, 1919–25.
 Lieutenant General Samuel B.M. Young – First United States Army Chief of Staff and MOLLUS Commander in Chief, 1915–19.
 Lieutenant General Adna R. Chaffee – United States Army Chief of Staff.
 Lieutenant General John C. Bates – Army Chief of Staff and MOLLUS Commander in Chief, 1909–11.
 Lieutenant General Henry C. Corbin – Adjutant General of the United States Army.
 Lieutenant General Arthur MacArthur – Medal of Honor recipient and MOLLUS Commander in Chief, 1912 (father of General Douglas MacArthur).
 Brevet Lieutenant General Winfield Scott – United States Army Commanding General (1841–1861) and hero of the War of 1812.
 Major General Thomas M. Anderson – Nephew of Brevet Major General Robert Anderson.
 Major General Christopher C. Augur – Veteran of the Mexican War and wounded in action at the Battle of Cedar Mountain.
 Major General Frank Baldwin – Two time Medal of Honor recipient.
 Major General Nathaniel P. Banks – Governor of Massachusetts and Congressman.
 Major General Zenas Bliss – Medal of Honor recipient.
 Major General Joseph Cabell Breckinridge, Sr. – Cousin of Vice President and Confederate general John C. Breckinridge.
 Major General John R. Brooke – MOLLUS Commander in Chief, 1905–07.
 Major General Ambrose Burnside – GAR Commander-in-Chief, 1871–73; Governor of Rhode Island and United States Senator.
 Major General Daniel Butterfield – Medal of Honor recipient.
 Major General George Cadwalader – First MOLLUS Commander and Chief, 1865–79.
 Major General Silas Casey – Career Army Officer.
 Major General John Clem – Youngest Union soldier in the Civil War.
 Major General George Armstrong Custer – Legendary Cavalryman and cultural icon.
 Major General Napoleon J.T. Dana
 Major General Grenville M. Dodge – MOLLUS Commander in Chief, 1907–09.
 Major General William H. Emory
 Major General Francis Fessenden – Lost a leg while commanding a brigade in the Red River Campaign.  Mayor of Portland, Maine.
 Major General James W. Forsyth – Commander of the 7th Cavalry Regiment at the Wounded Knee Massacre
 Major General William B. Franklin
 Major General John Gibbon – MOLLUS Commander in Chief, 1895–96
 Major General George L. Gillespie – Medal of Honor recipient, Chief Engineer and Assistant Chief of Staff of the United States Army
 Major General Gordon Granger – Author of the Juneteenth proclaimation
 Major General Adolphus Greely – Arctic explorer and Medal of Honor recipient
 Major General George S. Greene – Hero of Culp's Hill in the Battle of Gettysburg
 Major General Schuyler Hamilton – Grandson of Alexander Hamilton
 Major General Winfield Scott Hancock – MOLLUS Commander in Chief, 1879–86
 Major General Guy V. Henry – Recipient of the Medal of Honor
 Major General Oliver Otis Howard – Founder and namesake of Howard University
 Major General Charles Frederic Humphrey, Sr. - Quartermaster General and Medal of Honor recipient.
 Major General Henry Jackson Hunt – Commanded Union artillery during Picket's Charge at the Battle of Gettysburg
 Major General Erasmus D. Keyes
 Major General J. Warren Keifer – U.S. Representative and veteran of the Spanish–American War
 Major General William August Kobbé
 Major General Henry W. Lawton – Medal of Honor recipient
 Major General John A. Logan – GAR Commander-in-Chief, 1868–71; founder of Decoration Day; United States Senator and vice presidential candidate
 Major General George B. McClellan – United States Army Commanding General.
 Major General Henry C. Merriam – Medal of Honor recipient.
 Major General Wesley Merritt – Superintendent of West Point.
 Major General Robert Patterson – Veteran of the War of 1812, Mexican War and Civil War.
 Major General John Pope
 Major General John C. Robinson – Commander-in-Chief of the Grand Army of the Republic, 1877–79; Lieutenant Governor of New York, 1873–74; and Medal of Honor recipient.
 Major General William S. Rosecrans
 Major General Thomas H. Ruger
 Major General Theodore Runyon – Mayor of Newark, New Jersey and Ambassador to Germany.
 Major General William R. Shafter – Commander of V Corps in Cuba during the Spanish–American War.
 Major General Thomas W. Sherman
 Major General Henry W. Slocum
 Major General David S. Stanley – Medal of Honor recipient.
 Major General George Stoneman – Governor of California.
 Major General Samuel S. Sumner
 Major General Alfred Terry
 Major General George H. Thomas – Hero of the Battles of Chickamauga, Chattanooga and Nashville.
 Major General Frank Wheaton
 Major General Loyd Wheaton – Medal of Honor recipient.
 Major General James Harrison Wilson – Veteran of the Civil War, Spanish–American War and the Boxer Rebellion.
 Major General Thomas J. Wood
 Brevet Major General Adelbert Ames – Governor of and Senator from Mississippi.
 Brevet Major General Russell A. Alger – GAR Commander-in-Chief, 1889–90; Secretary of War during the Spanish–American War.
 Brevet Major General Nicholas Longworth Anderson – Nephew of Brevet Major General Robert Anderson and father of Ambassador Larz Anderson.
 Brevet Major General Robert Anderson – Hero of Fort Sumter.
 Brevet Major General Christopher Columbus Andrews – Diplomat and forester.
 Brevet Major General Absalom Baird – Medal of Honor recipient.
 Brevet Major General John G. Barnard – Distinguished military engineer.
 Brevet Major General George L. Beal – Treasurer of Maine.
 Brevet Major General John Milton Brannan – Career Army officer. Served in Mexican and Civil Wars.
 Brevet Major General James Henry Carleton
 Brevet Major General Joshua Lawrence Chamberlain – Hero of Little Round Top in the Battle of Gettysburg and Governor of Maine.
 Brevet Major General Augustus Louis Chetlain – Organized first Black Regiment in the Western Theater.
 Brevet Major General Charles H.T. Collis - Medal of Honor recipient.
 Brevet Major General Philip St. George Cooke – Author of cavalry tactics.
 Brevet Major General Newton Martin Curtis - Medal of Honor recipient.
 Brevet Major General Charles Devens – Commander-in-Chief of the Grand Army of the Republic, 1873–75.
 Brevet Major General James Deering Fessenden
 Brevet Major General Manning Ferguson Force - Medal of Honor recipient.
 Brevet Major General James Barnet Fry
 Brevet Major General George W. Getty
 Brevet Major General Lewis A. Grant - Medal of Honor recipient.
 Brevet Major General David McM. Gregg – Cavalry commander.
 Brevet Major General Cyrus Hamlin – Son of Vice President Hannibal Hamlin.
 Brevet Major General John F. Hartranft – GAR Commander-in-Chief, 1875–77; Governor of Pennsylvania and Medal of Honor recipient.
 Brevet Major General John Porter Hatch - Medal of Honor recipient.
 Brevet Major General Albion P. Howe – Veteran of both the Mexican War and the Civil War.
 Brevet Major General George H. Nye – Commander of the 29th Maine Regiment.
 Brevet Major General Richard W. Johnson
 Brevet Major General Hugh Judson Kilpatrick – one of the youngest generals in the Civil War.
 Brevet Major General Martin T. McMahon - Medal of Honor recipient.
 Brevet Major General St. Clair Augustine Mulholland - Medal of Honor recipient.
 Brevet Major General Alfred L. Pearson - Medal of Honor recipient.
 Brevet Major General Theodore S. Peck – Medal of Honor recipient.
 Brevet Major General Galusha Pennypacker – Youngest general during the Civil War.
 Brevet Major General William H. Powell - Medal of Honor recipient.
 Brevet Major General George H. Sharpe – Secret service agent.
 Brevet Major General Charles H. Smith - Medal of Honor recipient.
 Brevet Major General William Wells – Medal of Honor recipient.
 Brevet Major General Orlando B. Willcox – Medal of Honor recipient.
 Brigadier General George Lippitt Andrews
 Brigadier General Abraham K. Arnold - Medal of Honor recipient.
 Brigadier General John B. Babcock – Career officer and Medal of Honor recipient.
 Brigadier General Richard Napoleon Batchelder – Quartermaster General and Medal of Honor recipient.
 Brigadier General Joshua Hall Bates – Ohio state senator.
 Brigadier General William E. Birkhimer – Medal of Honor recipient.
 Brigadier General Louis H. Carpenter – Medal of Honor recipient.
 Brigadier General Thomas Lincoln Casey – Engineer who completed the Washington Monument.
 Brigadier General Powell Clayton – Governor of Arkansas, U.S. Senator and Ambassador to Mexico.
 Brigadier General Charles A. Coolidge
 Brigadier General Thomas L. Crittenden
 Brigadier General Francis S. Dodge - Army Paymaster General and Medal of Honor recipient.
 Brigadier General Eugene D. Dimmick – Career officer.
 Brigadier General Edgar S. Dudley
 Brigadier General Richard C. Drum – U.S. Army adjutant general.
 Brigadier General Charles P. Eagan – U.S. Army Commissary General court-martialed during the "embalmed beef" scandal during the Spanish–American War.  Expelled from MOLLUS after making disparaging remarks about General Nelson Miles before a Congressional committee investigating the scandal.
 Brigadier General William Ennis
 Brigadier General Lucius Fairchild – MOLLUS Commander in Chief, 1893–95; GAR Commander-in-Chief, 1886–87; Governor of Wisconsin and Minister to Spain.
 Brigadier General Samuel W. Fountain – MOLLUS Commander in Chief, 1930.
 Brigadier General Henry Blanchard Freeman – Medal of Honor recipient.
 Brigadier General John C. Gilmore - Medal of Honor recipient.
 Brigadier General Edward S. Godfrey – Medal of Honor recipient. 
 Brigadier General Edward H. Hobson
 Brigadier General Lucius F. Hubbard – Governor of Minnesota. Veteran of both the Civil War and the Spanish–American War.
 Brigadier General Eli L. Huggins – Medal of Honor recipient.
 Brigadier General Bernard J. D. Irwin – Medal of Honor recipient.
 Brigadier General Horatio Collins King - Medal of Honor recipient.
 Brigadier General Charles Mattocks - Medal of Honor recipient.
 Brigadier General John H. Patterson - Medal of Honor recipient.
 Brigadier General Alexander Cummings McWhorter Pennington Jr. – Career Army officer.
 Brigadier General Richard Henry Pratt – Founder of the Carlisle Indian Industrial School.
 Brigadier General Americus V. Rice – United States Representative.
 Brigadier General Edmund Rice – Medal of Honor recipient.
 Brigadier General Theophilus Francis Rodenbough - Medal of Honor recipient.
 Brigadier General George B. Rodney
 Brigadier General William H. Seward Jr. – Son of Secretary of State William Seward.
 Brigadier General Rufus Saxton – Third Medal of Honor recipient.
 Brigadier General Jacob H. Smith
 Brigadier General Julius Stahel – Hungarian-American Medal of Honor recipient and diplomat.
 Brigadier General Edwin Vose Sumner, Jr.
 Brigadier General David G. Swaim – Judge Advocate General of the U.S. Army.
 Brigadier General George Miller Sternberg – U.S. Army Surgeon General.
 Brigadier General Egbert L. Viele – United States Representative.
 Brigadier General Daniel D. Wheeler – Medal of Honor recipient.
 Brigadier General Samuel Whitside – Major of the 7th Cavalry Regiment at the Wounded Knee Massacre.
 Brigadier General John Moulder Wilson – Chief Engineer of the Army and Medal of Honor recipient.
 Brigadier General Carle A. Woodruff – Medal of Honor recipient.
 Brigadier General Horatio Gouverneur Wright – Chief Engineer of the United States Army.
 Brigadier General M.A.W. Shockley – medical corps career officer
 Brevet Brigadier General Charles Francis Adams Jr. – Railroad president.
 Brevet Brigadier General John Jacob Astor III – Philanthropist and socialite.
 Brevet Brigadier General Delevan Bates - Medal of Honor recipient.
 Brevet Brigadier General John C. Black – Medal of Honor recipient and Commander in Chief of the Grand Army of the Republic, 1903–04.
 Brevet Brigadier General Charles Brayton – Rhode Island postmaster and political boss.
 Brevet Brigadier General Cecil Clay – Medal of Honor recipient.
 Brevet Brigadier General Henry B. Clitz – Veteran of Mexican War.
 Brevet Brigadier General Amasa Cobb – United States Representative.
 Brevet Brigadier General Byron M. Cutcheon - Medal of Honor recipient.
 Brevet Brigadier General Rufus Dawes – Great-grandson of patriot William Dawes.
 Brevet Brigadier General Samuel Fallows – Reformed Episcopal bishop.
 Brevet Brigadier General Thomas Clement Fletcher - Governor of Missouri.
 Brevet Brigadier General John P. S. Gobin – GAR Commander-in-Chief, 1897–98; and lieutenant governor of Pennsylvania.
 Brevet Brigadier General Nathan Goff, Jr.
 Brevet Brigadier General Edwin S. Greeley – President General of the Sons of the American Revolution.
 Brevet Brigadier General Oliver Duff Greene - Medal of Honor recipient.
 Brevet Brigadier General James G. Grindlay - Medal of Honor recipient.
 Brevet Brigadier General Charles Hamlin – Son of Vice President Hannibal Hamlin.
 Brevet Brigadier General Albert G. Lawrence – Ambassador to Costa Rica.
 Brevet Brigadier General John Willock Noble – Secretary of the Interior.
 Brevet Brigadier General Paul A. Oliver - Medal of Honor recipient.
 Brevet Brigadier General Ario Pardee, Jr. – Defended Culp's Hill at the Battle of Gettysburg.
 Brevet Brigadier General Ely S. Parker – Seneca Native American aide to General Grant.
 Brevet Brigadier General Charles E. Phelps - Medal of Honor recipient.
 Brevet Brigadier General Horace Porter – Medal of Honor recipient and United States Ambassador to France.
 Brevet Brigadier General Philip S. Post - Medal of Honor recipient and Consul General to Austria-Hungary.
 Brevet Brigadier General Samuel Miller Quincy – Mayor of New Orleans.
 Brevet Brigadier General Isaac R. Sherwood – U.S. Representative
 Brevet Brigadier General Augustus B. R. Sprague – Mayor of Worcester, Massachusetts.
 Brevet Brigadier General Hazard Stevens – Medal of Honor recipient.
 Brevet Brigadier General William S. Tilton
 Brevet Brigadier General Francis A. Walker – President of the Massachusetts Institute of Technology
 Brevet Brigadier General Stephen Minot Weld Jr. – Businessman and horticulturalist.
 Brevet Brigadier General Joseph N. G. Whistler – Cousin of the artist James Abbott McNeill Whistler
 Brevet Brigadier General Edward W. Whitaker – Medal of Honor recipient.

Field officers
 Colonel Charles Anderson – 93rd Ohio Infantry, 27th Governor of Ohio, wounded at Stones River.
 Colonel George Grenville Benedict - Medal of Honor recipient.
 Colonel James S. Casey – Medal of Honor recipient.
 Colonel George Earl Church – Civil engineer, geographer, and explorer.
 Colonel Luigi Palma di Cesnola - Medal of Honor recipient and Director of the Metropolitan Museum of Art.
 Colonel John W. Foster – Ambassador and Secretary of State.
 Colonel Smith H. Hastings - Medal of Honor recipient.
 Colonel James Jackson – Medal of Honor recipient.
 Colonel William P. Kellogg – United States Senator and Governor of Louisiana.
 Colonel John Mason Loomis - Lumber tycoon.
 Colonel Douglas Putnam – Fought at the battles of Shiloh and Missionary Ridge.
 Colonel Matthew Quay – United States Senator and Medal of Honor recipient.
 Colonel Henry R. Tilton – Medal of Honor recipient.
 Colonel John Tweedale – Medal of Honor recipient. 
 Colonel Wheelock G. Veazey – GAR Commander-in-Chief, 1890–91; and Medal of Honor recipient.
 Colonel John Wainwright – Medal of Honor recipient.
 Colonel William C. Webb – Political figure.
 Colonel Henry Wilson – Vice President of the United States.
 Brevet Colonel Eugene B. Beaumont – Medal of Honor recipient.
 Brevet Colonel James Coey - Medal of Honor recipient.
 Brevet Colonel Stephen P. Corliss – Medal of Honor recipient.
 Brevet Colonel Benjamin W. Crowninshield – Aide de camp to General Philip Sheridan.
 Brevet Colonel Johnston de Peyster – Raised first Union flag over Richmond in 1865.
 Brevet Colonel William D. Dickey - Medal of Honor recipient.
 Brevet Colonel Douglas Hapeman - Medal of Honor recipient.
 Brevet Colonel Oliver Wendell Holmes Jr. – Supreme Court associate justice.
 Brevet Colonel Horatio Collins King – Medal of Honor recipient.
 Brevet Colonel Augustus Pearl Martin – Mayor of Boston.
 Brevet Colonel William R. Parnell - Medal of Honor recipient.
 Brevet Colonel Walter S. Payne – Commander-in-chief of the Sons of Union Veterans of the Civil War, 1885–87.
 Brevet Colonel Elisha Hunt Rhodes – Diarist and author and also served as Senior Vice Commander-in-Chief of the GAR.
 Brevet Colonel Robert S. Robertson - Medal of Honor recipient and Lieutenant Governor of Indiana.
 Brevet Colonel Washington A. Roebling – Engineer of the Brooklyn Bridge.
 Lieutenant Colonel William Henry Harrison Benyaurd – Medal of Honor recipient.
 Lieutenant Colonel James M. Burns – Medal of Honor recipient.
 Lieutenant Colonel Frederick Fuger – Medal of Honor recipient.
 Lieutenant Colonel Asa Bird Gardiner – Lawyer, author, and controversial political figure.
 Lieutenant Colonel Eli Lilly – Pharmaceutical chemist, industrialist, and entrepreneur.
 Lieutenant Colonel Theodore Lyman – Congressman from Massachusetts.
 Lieutenant Colonel James Quinlan - Medal of Honor recipient.
 Lieutenant Colonel William Y. W. Ripley - Medal of Honor recipient.
 Lieutenant Colonel Levi Parker Wright – First Commander of Fort Whipple which became Fort Myer
 Lieutenant Colonel T. Elwood Zell – Founder of MOLLUS.
 Brevet Lieutenant Colonel Samuel Nicoll Benjamin - Medal of Honor recipient.
 Brevet Lieutenant Colonel Charles A. Clark - Medal of Honor recipient.
 Brevet Lieutenant Colonel Henry A. du Pont – Medal of Honor recipient, industrialist and United States Senator.
 Brevet Lieutenant Colonel Robert Hale Ives Goddard – Businessman and reformist politician.
 Brevet Lieutenant Colonel George Edward Gouraud - Medal of Honor recipient.
 Brevet Lieutenant Colonel Samuel Brown Wylie Mitchell – Founder of MOLLUS.
 Major William Sully Beebe - Medal of Honor recipient.
 Major Mason Carter - Medal of Honor recipient.
 Major John M. Deane - Medal of Honor recipient.
 Major Charles DeRudio – Adventurer.
 Major John Mead Gould – Author, diarist, and banker.
 Major Moses Harris – Medal of Honor recipient.
 Major William W. McCammon - Medal of Honor recipient.
 Major Myles Moylan – Medal of Honor recipient.
 Major James B. Pond - Medal of Honor recipient.
 Major Charles M. Rockefeller – Medal of Honor recipient.
 Major Henry Romeyn - Medal of Honor recipient.
 Major Joseph A. Sladen – Medal of Honor recipient.
 Major Sidney W. Thaxter - Medal of Honor recipient.
 Major William Warner – GAR Commander-in-Chief, 1888–89.
 Major Edmund Zalinski – Inventor of the pneumatic dynamite gun.
 Surgeon Joseph K. Corson - Medal of Honor recipient.
 Surgeon Richard J. Curran - Medal of Honor recipient.
 Surgeon Gabriel Grant - Medal of Honor recipient.
 Surgeon George E. Ranney - Medal of Honor recipient.
 Surgeon John Maynard Woodworth – First Surgeon General of the United States.
 Brevet Major William H. Appleton - Medal of Honor recipient.
 Brevet Major Charles E. Belknap – U.S. Representative.
 Brevet Major Augustus P. Davis – Founder of the Sons of Union Veterans of the Civil War.
 Brevet Major Ira H. Evans – Medal of Honor recipient.
 Brevet Major Charles Gilbert Gould - Medal of Honor recipient.
 Brevet Major Rufus King Jr. – Medal of Honor recipient.
 Brevet Major William Marland - Medal of Honor recipient.
 Brevet Major George H. Maynard – Medal of Honor recipient.
 Brevet Major John Patterson Rea – GAR Commander-in-Chief, 1887–88.
 Brevet Major John Wallace Scott – Medal of Honor recipient.
 Brevet Major Adelbert B. Twitchell – Educator.

Company officers
 Captain John G. B. Adams – Medal of Honor recipient and GAR commander in chief, 1893–94.
 Captain Marion T. Anderson - Medal of Honor recipient.
 Captain Robert Burns Beath – GAR Commander-in-Chief, 1883–84.
 Captain Alexander M. Beattie - Medal of Honor recipient.
 Captain George W. Brush – Medal of Honor recipient.
 Captain Edward Lyon Buchwalter – Business executive.
 Captain Samuel Swinfin Burdett – GAR Commander-in-Chief, 1885–86.
 Captain John J. Carter - Medal of Honor recipient.
 Captain Robert G. Carter – Medal of Honor recipient.
 Captain Walter H. Cooke - Medal of Honor recipient.
 Captain Charles D. Copp - Medal of Honor recipient.
 Captain Stephen P. Corliss - Medal of Honor recipient.
 Captain Andrew Davidson - Medal of Honor recipient.
 Captain George E. Davis - Medal of Honor recpient.
 Captain Theodore R. Davis – Illustrator.
 Captain William W. Douglas – Chief Justice of the Rhode Island Supreme Court.
 Captain and Governor Elisha Dyer – Governor of Rhode Island.
 Captain George W. Ford - Medal of Honor recipient.
 Captain Frank Furness - Prolific architect and Medal of Honor recipient.
 Captain Peter Dirck Keyser – Founder of MOLLUS.
 Captain William A. Ketcham – Indiana Attorney General, Commander-in-Chief of the Grand Army of the Republic.
 Captain Oscar Lapham – U.S. Representative from Rhode Island.
 Captain Robert Todd Lincoln – Son of President Abraham Lincoln.
 Captain Sylvester H. Martin - Medal of Honor recipient.
 Captain George Sargent Merrill – GAR Commander-in-Chief, 1881–82.
 Captain William E. Miller - Medal of Honor recipient.
 Captain Elias Riggs Monfort – GAR Commander-in-Chief, 1915–16.
 Captain Walter S. Payne – Commander-in-Chief of the Sons of Veterans, 1885–1887.
 Captain Prince Philippe, Count of Paris (a.k.a. Philippe d'Orleans) – Claimant to the French throne.
 Captain Theodore S. Peck - Medal of Honor recipient.
 Captain James P. Postles - Medal of Honor recipient.
 Captain Milton Russell - Medal of Honor recipient.
 Captain Charlemagne Tower – Lawyer and businessman.
 Brevet Captain John Vernou Bouvier, Sr. - Great Grandfather of Jacqueline Kennedy.
 Brevet Captain Joseph B. Foraker – Governor of Ohio and United States Senator.
 Brevet Captain Francis M. Smith - Medal of Honor recipient.
 1st Lieutenant William B. Avery - Medal of Honor recipient.
 1st Lieutenant Francis E. Brownell – Medal of Honor recipient.
 1st Lieutenant Allan H. Dougall - Medal of Honor recipient.
 1st Lieutenant John Galloway – Medal of Honor recipient.
 1st Lieutenant Thomas P. Gere - Medal of Honor recipient.
 1st Lieutenant Charles P. Goodyear Jr. – Son of vulcanized rubber inventor Charles Goodyear.
 1st Lieutenant Charles A. Longfellow – Son of Henry Wadsworth Longfellow.
 1st Lieutenant John L. Mitchell – United States Senator and father of aviation prophet Billy Mitchell.
 1st Lieutenant John Palmer – GAR Commander-in-Chief, 1891–92; and New York Secretary of State.
 1st Lieutenant Anthony Taylor - Medal of Honor recipient.
 1st Lieutenant Amos Madden Thayer – Federal judge.
 1st Lieutenant William G. Thompson – Mayor of Detroit, Michigan.
 1st Lieutenant William H. Upham - Governor of Wisconsin.
 2nd Lieutenant Marcus A. Hanna – United States Senator and political boss.
 2nd Lieutenant Abraham G. Mills – President of the National League.
 Chaplain Charles Comfort Tiffany – Episcopal clergyman.
 Chaplain Henry Clay Trumbull – Leader in the Sunday School Movement.

United States Navy
 Admiral of the Navy George Dewey – Hero of the Battle of Manila Bay. Senior Navy Admiral, 1898–1917.
 Admiral David G. Farragut – Hero of the Battle of Mobile Bay. Senior Navy Admiral, 1862–1870.
 Admiral David Dixon Porter – Senior Navy Admiral, 1870-1891.
 Vice Admiral Stephen Clegg Rowan – Mexican War and Civil War veteran. Served as vice admiral from 1870 to 1889.
 Rear Admiral John J. Almy – MOLLUS Commander in Chief, 1893.
 Rear Admiral Cipriano Andrade – First U.S. Navy admiral born in Mexico.
 Rear Admiral Conway Hillyer Arnold
 Rear Admiral Theodorus Bailey
 Rear Admiral John R. Bartlett – Oceanographer.
 Rear Admiral George E. Belknap
 Rear Admiral Gottfried Blocklinger - one of the last Civil War veterans to join MOLLUS.
 Rear Admiral Daniel L. Braine
 Rear Admiral William G. Buehler
 Rear Admiral and Brevet Major General Samuel P. Carter – Only person to have been an admiral in the U.S. Navy and also a general in the U.S. Army.
 Rear Admiral Silas Casey III
 Rear Admiral French Ensor Chadwick – President of the Naval War College.
 Rear Admiral Charles Edgar Clark – Captain of  during the Spanish–American War.
 Rear Admiral Joseph Coghlan – Commander of the cruiser  at the Battle of Manila Bay.
 Rear Admiral George Partridge Colvocoresses
 Rear Admiral William S. Cowles
 Rear Admiral Arent S. Crowninshield
 Rear Admiral Charles Henry Davis
 Rear Admiral Nehemiah Dyer – Participated in both the Battle of Mobile Bay and Battle of Manila Bay where he commanded the cruiser .
 Rear Admiral Robley D. Evans – Commander of the Great White Fleet.
 Rear Admiral Norman von Heldreich Farquhar
 Rear Admiral William M. Folger
 Rear Admiral John D. Ford – Participated in both the Battle of Mobile Bay and Battle of Manila Bay.
 Rear Admiral Bancroft Gherardi – MOLLUS Commander in Chief, 1896–1899.
 Rear Admiral James Henry Gillis
 Rear Admiral Henry Glass – Led capture of Guam during the Spanish–American War.
 Rear Admiral Caspar F. Goodrich – President of the Naval War College.
 Rear Admiral Purnell F. Harrington – MOLLUS Commander in Chief, 1925–1927.
 Rear Admiral Richard Inch
 Rear Admiral Louis Kempff – MOLLUS Commander in Chief, 1915.
 Rear Admiral Lewis A. Kimberly
 Rear Admiral Stephen B. Luce – Founder of the United States Naval War College.
 Rear Admiral Bowman H. McCalla – Captured Guantanamo Bay, Cuba in 1898.
 Rear Admiral Richard Worsam Meade III – Nephew of Major General George G. Meade.
 Rear Admiral George W. Melville – MOLLUS Commander in Chief, 1911–1912, survivor of the ill-fated  expedition and recipient of the Congressional Gold Medal.
 Rear Admiral John Porter Merrell – President of the Naval War College.
 Rear Admiral Jefferson Franklin Moser
 Rear Admiral George H. Preble – Nephew of Commodore Edward Preble.
 Rear Admiral William Radford
 Rear Admiral Alexander Rhind – Veteran of the Mexican War.
 Rear Admiral Christopher Raymond Perry Rodgers - Nephew of Commodores Oliver Hazard Perry and Matthew C. Perry.
 Rear Admiral Frederick Rodgers
 Rear Admiral John Augustus Rodgers - Grandson of Commodore Matthew C. Perry.
 Rear Admiral John Henry Russell
 Rear Admiral William T. Sampson – Commander of Naval Forces at the Battle of Santiago de Cuba.
 Rear Admiral Thomas O. Selfridge
 Rear Admiral Thomas O. Selfridge, Jr.
 Rear Admiral Winfield Scott Schley – Commanded cruiser USS Brooklyn at the Battle of Santiago de Cuba.
 Rear Admiral Montgomery Sicard – Chief of the US Navy Bureau of Ordnance.
 Rear Admiral Charles Stewart – Hero of the War of 1812.
 Rear Admiral Yates Stirling
 Rear Admiral Charles H. Stockton – President of the Naval War College.
 Rear Admiral William T. Swinburne
 Rear Admiral Edward D. Taussig – Claimed Wake Island and Governor of Guam.
 Rear Admiral Henry Clay Taylor – President of the Naval War College.
 Rear Admiral George H. Wadleigh
 Rear Admiral Henry A. Walke
 Rear Admiral John G. Walker – Chief of the Bureau of Navigation.
 Rear Admiral John C. Watson
 Rear Admiral Frank Wildes – Captain of the cruiser  at the Battle of Manila Bay.
 Commodore Oscar C. Badger
 Commodore Henry Eagle
 Commodore Edward André Gabriel Barrett
 Commodore John P. Gillis – Veteran of the Mexican War and the Civil War.
 Commodore John Guest
 Commodore William H. Macomb
 Commodore George H. Perkins
 Commodore William F. Spicer
 Commodore William T. Truxton
 Captain Richard Worsam Meade II – Brother of Major General George G. Meade.
 Captain James S. Thornton
 Commander Zera Luther Tanner – Commanding officer of the research ship USFC Albatross.
 Lieutenant Commander William Gurdon Saltonstall 
 Master Robert M. Thompson – MOLLUS Commander in Chief, 1927–1930.

United States Marine Corps
 Major General Charles Heywood – Commandant of the United States Marine Corps.
 Brigadier General Henry Clay Cochrane – Veteran of the Civil War, Spanish–American War and Boxer Rebellion.
 Brigadier General James Forney – Posthumous recipient of the Marine Corps Brevet Medal.
 Brigadier General Percival Pope – Recipient of the Marine Corps Brevet Medal.
 Brigadier General Jacob Zeilin – Commandant of the United States Marine Corps.
 Brevet Brigadier General Robert Leamy Meade – Nephew of Major General George G. Meade.
 Colonel Robert W. Huntington – Commanded the 1st Marine Battalion at Guantanamo Bay in 1898.
 Colonel Charles Grymes McCawley – Commandant of the United States Marine Corps.
 Lieutenant Colonel John L. Broome – Veteran of the Mexican War and the Civil War.
 Major and Paymaster John C. Cash

3rd Class Companions
From 1865 to 1890 a limited number of civilians who contributed outstanding service to the Union during the Civil War were elected into the Order as 3rd Class Companions.
 John Albion Andrew – Governor of Massachusetts.
 Henry B. Anthony – United States Senator and Governor of Rhode Island.
 Alexander D. Bache – Topographical engineer.
 Austin Blair – Governor of Michigan.
 Salmon P. Chase – Secretary of the Treasury.
 Andrew Gregg Curtin – Governor of Pennsylvania.
 John Watts de Peyster – Major General in the New York Militia.
 William C. Endicott – Secretary of War.
 John M. Forbes – Railroad magnate, philanthropist and abolitionist.
 Lafayette S. Foster – United States Senator from Connecticut.
 Edward Everett Hale – Unitarian clergyman and abolitionist.
 Hannibal Hamlin – Vice President of the United States.
 John B. Henderson – United States Senator and author of the 13th Amendment.
 William W. Hoppin – Governor of Rhode Island.
 David Jerome – State senator from Michigan.
 Benito Juarez – President of Mexico.
 Frederic W. Lincoln – Mayor of Boston.
 Frederick F. Low – Governor of California.
 George W. McCrary – Secretary of War under President Hayes.
 Frederick Law Olmsted – Secretary of the United States Sanitary Commission and designer of Central Park.
 Joel Parker - Governor of New Jersey.
 John S. Pillsbury – Founder of the Pillsbury Company and Governor of Minnesota.
 Alexander H. Rice – Mayor of Boston, Congressman and Governor of Massachusetts.
 Theodore Roosevelt, Sr. – Treasurer of the Union League Club and father of President Theodore Roosevelt.
 William H. Seward – Secretary of State.
 John Sherman – Secretary of State, Secretary of the Treasury and United States Senator.
 James Speed – Attorney General.
 William Sprague – Governor of Rhode Island and United States Senator.
 Edwin M. Stanton – Secretary of War.
 John P. Usher – Secretary of the Interior.
 Gideon Welles – Secretary of the Navy.

Hereditary Companions

Originally, the MOLLUS had Companions of the Second Class, who were the eldest sons of Companions of the First Class (i.e., veterans of the Civil War who also held a commission at some point).  A Second Class Companion became a First Class Companion upon the death of his father, and brothers of fallen officers were allowed to join as hereditary companions if there was no surviving issue.  These practices was discontinued in 1905, when the MOLLUS Constitution was changed to allow any direct male descendant of a Union officer to become a MOLLUS Companion. The nomenclature of First Class and Second Class Companions was discarded, leaving only the qualifiers of  "Original" and "Hereditary" Companions.  Later, the eligibility rules were changed to allow nephews of Union officers to become hereditary Companions of the MOLLUS; and as of October 2021, a first-cousin relationship to an officer (i.e., the officer was the child of the aunt or uncle of the applicant) qualifies the applicant for hereditary membership.

Military and naval officers
 General of the Army Douglas MacArthur – Legendary general. Son of Lieutenant General Arthur MacArthur, Jr.
 General Jonathan Wainwright – Medal of Honor recipient.
 Admiral William V. Pratt – President of the Naval War College and Chief of Naval Operations.
 Lieutenant General Albert Jesse Bowley, Sr. – Veteran of the Spanish–American War and World War I.
 Lieutenant General Adna R. Chaffee, Jr. – Father of the U.S. Army Armor branch.
 Lieutenant General John MacNair Wright, Jr. – Veteran of World War II and the Vietnam War.
 Vice Admiral Walter N. Vernou, USN – Veteran of the Spanish–American War, World War I and World War II.
 Major General Malvern Hill Barnum – Commanded the 183rd Brigade during World War I.  MOLLUS Commander in Chief, 1940–41.
 Major General Frederick Dent Grant – Son of General Ulysses S. Grant.
 Major General Ulysses S. Grant III – MOLLUS Commander in Chief, 1957–61; Commander in Chief of the Sons of Union Veterans of the Civil War, 1953–55 and President of the Aztec Club of 1847.
 Major General Sherman Miles – Son of Lieutenant General Nelson A. Miles.
 Major General John H. Russell, Jr. – Commandant of the Marine Corps.
 Major General Henry G. Sharpe – Quartermaster General of the Army.
 Major General Samuel D. Sturgis, Jr. – General in World War I.
 Major General Clayton Barney Vogel, USMC – Founder of the Navajo Code Talkers.
 Rear Admiral Charles J. Badger – Commander in Chief, Atlantic Fleet, 1913–14.
 Rear Admiral Reginald R. Belknap – MOLLUS Commander in Chief, 1947–51.
 Rear Admiral William H. Emory, Jr., USN
 Rear Admiral John B. Hamilton, USPHS – Second Surgeon General of the United States.
 Rear Admiral Richard Worsam Meade III, USN
 Rear Admiral Yates Stirling, Jr., USN
 Rear Admiral Herbert Winslow – Son of Rear Admiral John Ancrum Winslow.
 Brigadier General Charles Wheaton Abbot, Jr. – Adjutant General of Rhode Island.
 Brigadier General George Andrews – Adjutant General of the United States Army.
 Brigadier General William M. Cruikshank
 Brigadier General Elisha Dyer, Jr., RIM – Governor of Rhode Island.
 Brigadier General Webb Hayes – Medal of Honor recipient and son of President Rutherford B. Hayes.
 Brigadier General Charles King, USV – Son of Brigadier General Rufus King.
 Brigadier General Charles L. McCawley, USMC
 Brigadier General Billy Mitchell, USAAS – Military air power prophet.
 Brigadier General George C. Reid, II, USMC – Medal of Honor recipient.
 Brevet Brigadier General George Leamy Meade, USMC – Nephew of Major General George G. Meade.
 Colonel Frederick W. Galbraith, Jr., NA – Second National Commander of the American Legion.
 Colonel George H. Morgan, USA – Recipient of the Medal of Honor.
 Colonel Melville Shaw, USMC – Recipient of the Marine Corps Brevet Medal.
 Colonel Herbert Jermain Slocum – Commander at the Battle of Columbus, New Mexico.
 Captain Alfred Brooks Fry, USNR – Marine engineer.
 Captain Arthur MacArthur III, USN – Brother of General Douglas MacArthur.
 Captain Worth G. Ross, USRCS – Commandant of the Revenue Cutter Service.
 Lieutenant Colonel Russell Benjamin Harrison, USV – Son of President Benjamin Harrison.
 Lieutenant Colonel Henry L. Roosevelt, USMC – Assistant Secretary of the Navy.
 Major John Vernou Bouvier Jr. - Lawyer, stockbroker and grandfather of Jacqueline Kennedy.
 Major John Alexander Logan, Jr., USV – Medal of Honor recipient.
 Major Theodore Lyman, NA – Noted physicist and professor at Harvard University.
 Major Robert Powell Page Wainwright, USV – Father of General Jonathan Wainwright.
 Captain Larz Anderson, USV – Minister to Belgium and Ambassador to Japan.

Public officials
 John Clayton Allen – United States Representative.
 Captain and Ambassador Larz Anderson – Minister to Belgium and Ambassador to Japan.
 Warren R. Austin – United States Senator.
 Zenas Work Bliss – Lieutenant Governor of Rhode Island.
 Congressman Henry S. Boutell – Minister to Switzerland.
 Private and United States Senator Morgan Bulkeley – President of the Aetna Insurance Company.
 Thomas M. Foglietta – U.S. Representative and Ambassador to Italy.
 Albert Johnson – U.S. Representative.
 Major George A. Paddock – U.S. Representative.
 Lieutenant Colonel Henry L. Roosevelt, USMC – Assistant Secretary of the Navy.
 Lieutenant Colonel (Ret) Steve Russell – U.S. Representative
 James W. Wadsworth, Jr. – United States Senator.
 Stuyvesant Wainwright II – U.S. Representative.
 Leland Justin Webb – Mayor of Columbus, Kansas and Commander-in-Chief of the Sons of Veterans.
 Ambassador Henry L. Wilson – Ambassador to Mexico.
 George P. Wheeler – Minister to Paraguay and Albania.
 Robert J. Wynne – U.S. Postmaster General.

Others
 Henry L. P. Beckwith, Jr. – Heraldist and genealogist.
 Delevan Bates Bowley – Commander in chief of the Sons of Union Veterans of the Civil War,  1928–29.
 John Nicholas Brown II – Philanthropist.
 Rufus C. Dawes – Utility company president and brother of Charles G. Dawes.
 Reverend Morgan Dix – Episcopal priest and son of Major General John A. Dix.
 Harry Augustus Garfield – President of Williams College and son of President and Major General James A. Garfield.
 William Osborn McDowell – Founder of the Sons of the American Revolution.
 Prince Philippe, Duke of Orleans – Claimant to the French throne.

Associate Companions
MOLLUS allows state commanderies, at their own discretion, to elect up to one third of their membership as Associate Companions.
 Jonas Arnell-Szurkos – Swedish phaleristics expert, Herald at the Chancery of His Majesty's Royal Orders of Knighthood.
 Mark Felton – British YouTuber, author, and historian of the Second World War.
 Perley Mellor – Commander-in-Chief, Sons of Union Veterans of the Civil War, 2012–2013.
 Frank J. Williams – Retired Chief Justice of the Rhode Island Supreme Court.

Posthumous Companions
 President Abraham Lincoln
 Major General George Meade – Commander of the Army of the Potomac
 1st Lieutenant Alonzo Cushing – Medal of Honor recipient

Non-members who were or are eligible for membership

Eligible veteran officers who did not join MOLLUS
A number of noteworthy Union officers, although eligible, did not become MOLLUS companions. They included the following:

Brigadier General and President Andrew Johnson, Major General and President James Garfield, Major General and United States Senator Francis Preston Blair, Jr., Brevet Brigadier General Kit Carson, Major General John A. Dix, Acting Ensign Pierre d'Orleans, Duke of Penthièvre, Rear Admiral Samuel Dupont, Major General John G. Foster, Major General John C. Fremont,  Captain Charles Vernon Gridley USN, Brevet Major General William S. Harney, Rear Admiral Alfred Thayer Mahan, Major General George Meade, Major General and Governor Edwin D. Morgan, Major General Edward Ord, Major General Daniel Sickles, Brevet Major General Emory Upton, Brevet Brigadier General Thomas J. Rodman, Brevet Brigadier General Sylvanus Thayer, Captain Augustin Thompson, Brevet Major General Zealous Bates Tower, Acting Assistant Third Engineer George Westinghouse, Rear Admiral John Ancrum Winslow, Major General John E. Wool.

Major General George Meade was posthumously inducted as a MOLLUS companion in 2015.

Noteworthy persons eligible for hereditary companionship in MOLLUS
William Waldorf Astor, 1st Viscount Astor was, and his male descendants are, eligible for hereditary membership in MOLLUS by right of his father's service in the Union Army.  All other male descendants of Rear Admiral Winfield Scott Schley
and William Backhouse Astor Sr. are eligible for membership in MOLLUS by collateral descent.

All male descendants of 19th-century railroad tycoon Cornelius Vanderbilt are eligible to join MOLLUS as collateral descendants of Vanderbilt's youngest son, Captain George Washington Vanderbilt, who graduated West Point in 1860 and died on January 1, 1864, in Nice, France without issue.  These descendants include the current Duke of Marlborough and CNN reporter Anderson Cooper.  Anderson Cooper is also eligible for hereditary membership in MOLLUS by right of his descent from Major General Hugh Judson Kilpatrick.

Major General David D. Porter, USMC, a recipient of the Medal of Honor, was eligible to for membership in MOLLUS by right of his descent from his grandfather, Admiral David Dixon Porter.

Secretary of State John Foster Dulles and his brother, CIA Director Allen Dulles were eligible for membership in MOLLUS by right of their descent from their maternal grandfather Colonel John W. Foster, who served as Secretary of State in the administration of President Benjamin Harrison.

Vice-President of the United States Richard (Dick) Cheney, by right of descent from Captain Samuel Fletcher Cheney of the 21st Ohio Volunteer Infantry.

John Bouvier Kennedy Schlossberg, grandson of President John F. Kennedy, by right of descent from Captain John V. Bouvier of the 80th New York Volunteer Infantry (20th New York State Militia). Captain Bouvier was the great-grandfather of First Lady Jacqueline Bouvier Kennedy.

Eligible royalty
Several Europeans of royal descent at eligible for membership in MOLLUS by right of their descent from Captain Philippe d'Orleans, the grandson of King Louis Philippe I of France.

King Felipe VI of Spain and his father, former King of Spain Juan Carlos, are eligible for hereditary companionship in MOLLUS, as are their male descendants.  The same is true for the family of the Orleanist pretenders to the throne of France.

King Manuel II of Portugal (1889–1932) was eligible to become a hereditary companion of MOLLUS as his mother was a daughter of Philippe d'Orleans. He had no offspring.

Prince Pedro Carlos of Orléans-Braganza (b. 1945), is a claimant to the Brazilian throne and a descendant of Philippe d'Orleans.  His nephew is Peter, Hereditary Prince of Yugoslavia (b. 1980).

Prince Amedeo, Duke of Aosta (b. 1943), head of the House of Savoy and claimant to the throne of Italy, is eligible for Hereditary MOLLUS membership but was elected as an honorary member instead.

A number of other individuals of royal descent can join MOLLUS by right of their descent from Prince Robert, Duke of Chartres – the brother of Prince Philippe, who also served with the Union Army. These descendants included Prince Michael of Greece and Denmark (b. 1938) and previously included Henri, Count of Paris (1908–1999) (longtime pretender to the French throne), Count Aage of Rosenborg (1887–1940) (who served as an officer in the French Foreign Legion), and Prince Axel of Denmark (1888–1964).

Prince Pierre, Duke of Penthièvre was a cousin of the Count of Paris and served in the Union Navy as an ensign on the frigate USS John Adams.

See also

 Society of the Cincinnati
 Aztec Club of 1847
 Grand Army of the Republic
 Military Order of the Stars and Bars
 Sons of Union Veterans of the Civil War
 Military Order of Foreign Wars
 Naval Order of the United States
 Naval and Military Order of the Spanish War
 Military Order of the Dragon
 Military Order of the Carabao

References

Further reading

External links
 
 MOLLUS-organized marker for Union POWs buried in Richmond, Virginia
 MOLLUS-Massachusetts Photograph Collection US Army Heritage and Education Center, Carlisle Barracks, Pennsylvania

American Civil War veterans and descendants organizations
Union Army
Military history of the United States
Fraternal orders
Lineage societies
1865 establishments in the United States
Organizations established in 1865